Åge Vedel Tåning (27 July 1890 – 26 September 1958 in Copenhagen) was a Danish ichthyologist. He was a director of the Carlsberg Laboratory, the Dana collection and the Danish Fisheries Research Station.

Taxon named in his honor 
Lanternfish genus Taaningichthys was named in his honour by Rolf Ling Bolin in 1959.
The Slopewater lanternfish, Diaphus taaningi Norman, 1930, is a species of lanternfish found in the Eastern Atlantic Ocean.

Taxon described by him
See :Category:Taxa named by Åge Vedel Tåning

References

1890 births
1958 deaths
Danish ichthyologists
20th-century Danish zoologists
Carlsberg Laboratory staff